Colletes caspicus is a species of insect belonging to the family Colletidae.

It is native to Southern Europe and Western Asia.

Synonym:
 Colletes balticus (= Colletes caspicus balticus)

References

Colletidae